Sabal maritima is a species of palm which is native to Jamaica and Cuba.

Description
Plants have about 25 leaves, each with 70–110 leaflets. The inflorescences, which are branched and as long as the leaves, bear pear-shaped to globose, black fruit.

Taxonomy
Sabal is placed in the subfamily Coryphoideae and the tribe Sabaleae.  As of 2008, there appear to be no molecular phylogenetic studies of Sabal.

The species was first described by Carl Sigismund Kunth as Corypha maritima in 1816, based on collections made by Alexander von Humboldt and Aimé Bonpland.  It was transferred to the genus Sabal by Italian naturalist Odoardo Beccari in 1933.

Andrew Henderson and colleagues noted that Sabal maritima, S. causiarum and S. domingensis form a species complex that may constitute a single species.

References

maritima
Trees of Cuba
Trees of Jamaica
Plants described in 1816